Jeff Williams (born January 12, 1978) is an American tennis player.

Williams has a career high ATP singles ranking of 337 achieved on August 5, 2002. He also has a career high ATP doubles ranking of 180, achieved on July 31, 2000. Williams has won 2 ITF singles titles.

Futures and Challenger Doubles titles (10)

Sources
 
 

Living people
1978 births
American male tennis players
Place of birth missing (living people)